Imaging X-ray Polarimetry Explorer, commonly known as IXPE or SMEX-14, is a space observatory with three identical telescopes designed to measure the polarization of cosmic X-rays of black holes, neutron stars, and pulsars. The observatory, which was launched on 9 December 2021, is an international collaboration between NASA and the Italian Space Agency (ASI). It is part of NASA's Explorers program, which designs low-cost spacecraft to study heliophysics and astrophysics.

The mission will study exotic astronomical objects and permit mapping of the magnetic fields of black holes, neutron stars, pulsars, supernova remnants, magnetars, quasars, and active galactic nuclei. The high-energy X-ray radiation from these objects' surrounding environment can be polarized oscillating in a particular direction. Studying the polarization of X-rays reveals the physics of these objects and can provide insights into the high-temperature environments where they are created.

Overview 

The IXPE mission was announced on 3 January 2017 and was launched on 9 December 2021. The international collaboration was signed in June 2017, when the Italian Space Agency (ASI) committed to provide the X-ray polarization detectors. The estimated cost of the mission and its two-year operation is US$188 million (the launch cost is US$50.3 million). The goal of the IXPE mission is to expand understanding of high-energy astrophysical processes and sources, in support of NASA's first science objective in astrophysics: "Discover how the universe works". By obtaining X-ray polarimetry and polarimetric imaging of cosmic sources, IXPE addresses two specific science objectives: to determine the radiation processes and detailed properties of specific cosmic X-ray sources or categories of sources; and to explore general relativistic and quantum effects in extreme environments.

During IXPE's two-year mission, it will study targets such as active galactic nuclei, quasars, pulsars, pulsar wind nebulae, magnetars, accreting X-ray binaries, supernova remnants, and the Galactic Center.

The spacecraft was built by Ball Aerospace & Technologies. The principal investigator is Martin C. Weisskopf of NASA Marshall Space Flight Center; he is the chief scientist for X-ray astronomy at NASA's Marshall Space Flight Center and project scientist for the Chandra X-ray Observatory spacecraft.

Other partners include the McGill University, Massachusetts Institute of Technology (MIT), Roma Tre University, Stanford University,  OHB Italia and the University of Colorado Boulder.

Objectives 
The technical and science objectives include:
 Improve polarization sensitivity by two orders of magnitude over the X-ray polarimeter aboard the Orbiting Solar Observatory 8
 Provide simultaneous spectral, spatial, and temporal measurements
 Determine the geometry and the emission mechanism of active galactic nuclei and microquasars
 Find the magnetic field configuration in magnetars and determine the magnitude of the field
 Find the mechanism for X-ray production in pulsars (both isolated and accreting) and the geometry
 Determine how particles are accelerated in pulsar wind nebula

Telescopes 
The space observatory features three identical telescopes designed to measure the polarization of cosmic X-rays. The polarization-sensitive detector was invented and developed by Italian scientists of the Istituto Nazionale di AstroFisica (INAF) and the Istituto Nazionale di Fisica Nucleare (INFN) and was refined over several years.

Principle 
IXPE's payload is a set of three identical imaging X-ray polarimetry systems mounted on a common optical bench and co-aligned with the pointing axis of the spacecraft. Each system operates independently for redundancy and comprises a mirror module assembly that focuses X-rays onto a polarization-sensitive imaging detector developed in Italy. The  focal length is achieved using a deployable boom.

The Gas Pixel Detectors (GPD) rely on the anisotropy of the emission direction of photoelectrons produced by polarized photons to gauge with high sensitivity the polarization state of X-rays interacting in a gaseous medium. Position-dependent and energy-dependent polarization maps of such synchrotron-emitting sources will reveal the magnetic-field structure of the X-ray emitting regions. X-ray polarimetric imaging better indicates the magnetic structure in regions of strong electron acceleration. The system is capable to resolve point sources from surrounding nebular emission or from adjacent point sources.

Launch profile 

IXPE was launched on 9 December 2021 on a SpaceX Falcon 9 (B1061.5) from LC-39A at NASA's Kennedy Space Center in Florida. The relatively small size and mass of the observatory falls well short of the normal capacity of SpaceX's Falcon 9 launch vehicle. However, Falcon 9 had to work to get IXPE into the correct orbit because IXPE is designed to operate in an almost exactly equatorial orbit with a 0° inclination. Launching from Cape Canaveral, which is located 28.5° above the equator, it was physically impossible to launch directly into a 0.2° equatorial orbit. Instead, the rocket needed to launch due east into a parking orbit and then perform a plane, or inclination, change once in space, as the spacecraft crossed the equator.

IXPE is the first satellite dedicated to measuring the polarization of X-rays from a variety of cosmic sources, such as black holes and neutron stars. The orbit hugging the equator will minimize the X-ray instrument's exposure to radiation in the South Atlantic Anomaly, the region where the inner Van Allen radiation belt comes closest to Earth's surface.

Operations 
IXPE is built to last for two years. After that it may be retired and deorbited or given an extended mission.

After launch and deployment of the IXPE spacecraft, NASA pointed the spacecraft at 1ES 1959+650, a black hole, and SMC X-1, a pulsar, for calibration. After that the spacecraft observed its first science target, Cassiopeia A. A first-light image of Cassiopeia A was released on 11 January 2022. 30 targets are planned to be observed during IXPE's first year.

IXPE communicates with Earth via a ground station in Malindi, Kenya. The ground station is owned and operated by the Italian Space Agency.

At present mission operations for IXPE are controlled by the Laboratory for Atmospheric and Space Physics (LASP).

Results 
In May 2022 the first study of IXPE hinted the possibility of vacuum birefringence on 4U 0142+61 and in August another study looked at Centaurus A measuring low polarization degree, suggesting that the X-ray emission is coming from a scattering process rather than arising directly from the accelerated particles of the jet.

Gallery

See also 

 Astrophysical X-ray source
 Explorer program
 GEMS, a similar spacecraft
 List of X-ray space telescopes
 X-ray astronomy
 X-ray telescope

References 

Space telescopes
X-ray telescopes
NASA satellites orbiting Earth
Explorers Program
Spacecraft launched in 2021